I Feel So Bad may refer to:
"I Feel So Bad" (Chuck Willis song), 1953
"I Feel So Bad" (Kungs song), 2016